Ian Porteous (born 21 November 1964) is a Scottish former footballer.

He played for Aberdeen before moving to Denmark to play for Herfølge Boldklub.  He later returned to Scotland to play for Kilmarnock.

Born in the Castlemilk area of Glasgow

External links

1964 births
Living people
Scottish footballers
Scottish Football League players
Aberdeen F.C. players
Herfølge Boldklub players
Kilmarnock F.C. players
Association football wingers
Footballers from Glasgow
Elgin City F.C. players
Arbroath F.C. players
Scottish expatriate footballers
Expatriate men's footballers in Denmark
Scottish expatriate sportspeople in Denmark
Expatriate association footballers in New Zealand
Scottish expatriate sportspeople in New Zealand